Pugwash District High School (PDHS) is a secondary school located in Pugwash, Nova Scotia. PDHS is part of the Chignecto-Central Regional School Board and is the only high school in the town of Pugwash. This secondary school receives the majority of students from a combination of Wallace Consolidated Elementary School, Cyrus Eaton Elementary School, and other smaller primary schools in the area.

Administration  

Principal – Shawn Brunt
Vice Principal – Sean Ethier
School Counsellor – Jeff Purchase

References

External links
 

High schools in Nova Scotia
Schools in Cumberland County, Nova Scotia